Events in the year 1980 in Mexico.

Incumbents

Federal government
 President: José López Portillo
 Interior Secretary (SEGOB): Enrique Olivares Santana (until November 30), Manuel Bartlett Díaz (starting December 1)
 Secretary of Foreign Affairs (SRE): Jorge Castañeda y Álvarez 
 Communications Secretary (SCT): Emilio Mújica Montoya
 Secretary of Defense (SEDENA): Félix Galván López
 Secretary of Navy: Ricardo Cházaro Lara
 Secretary of Labor and Social Welfare: Pedro Ojeda Paullada
 Secretary of Welfare: Pedro Ramírez Vázquez
 Secretary of Public Education: Fernando Solana Morales
 Tourism Secretary (SECTUR): Guillermo Rossell de la Lama/Rosa Luz Alegría Escamilla

Supreme Court

 President of the Supreme Court: Agustín Téllez Cruces

Governors

 Aguascalientes: José Refugio Esparza Reyes/Rodolfo Landeros Gallegos (PRI)
 Baja California: Roberto de la Madrid (PRI)
 Baja California Sur: Angel César Mendoza Arámburo (PRI)
 Campeche: José Refugio Esparza Reyes/Rodolfo Landeros Gallegos (PRI)
 Chiapas: Eugenio Echeverría Castellot (PRI)
 Chihuahua: Manuel Bernardo Aguirre/Óscar Ornelas (PRI)
 Coahuila: Oscar Flores Tapia/Francisco José Madero González (PRI)
 Colima: Griselda Álvarez (PRI)
 Durango: Salvador Gámiz Fernández/Armando del Castillo Franco (PRI)
 Guanajuato: Enrique Velasco Ibarra (PRI)
 Guerrero: Rubén Figueroa Figueroa (PRI)
 Hidalgo: Jorge Rojo Lugo (PRI)
 Jalisco: Flavio Romero de Velasco (PRI)
 State of Mexico: Jorge Jiménez Cantú
 Michoacán: Carlos Torres Manzo/Cuauhtemoc Cardenas
 Morelos: Armando León Bejarano (PRI)
 Nayarit: Rogelio Flores Curiel (PRI)
 Nuevo León: Flavio Romero de Velasco
 Oaxaca: Eliseo Jimenez Ruiz/Pedro Vasquez Colmenares (PRI)
 Puebla: Toxqui Fernández de Lara (PRI)
 Querétaro: Rafael Camacho Guzmán (PRI)
 Quintana Roo: Fernando Pámanes Escobedo/José Guadalupe Cervantes Corona (PRI)
 San Luis Potosí: Carlos Jonguitud Barrios (PRI)
 Sinaloa: Alfonso G. Calderón (PRI)
 Sonora: Samuel Ocaña García
 Tabasco: Leandro Rovirosa Wade (PRI)
 Tamaulipas: Enrique Cárdenas González (PRI)
 Tlaxcala: Emilio Sánchez Piedras (PRI)
 Veracruz: Rafael Hernández Ochoa (PRI)
 Yucatán: Francisco Luna Kan (PRI)
 Zacatecas: Fernando Pámanes Escobedo/José Guadalupe Cervantes Corona (PRI)
Regent of Mexico City: Carlos Hank González

Events

 Zeta is founded. 
 The Centro de Investigación en Matemáticas is established. 
 The Centro de Investigaciones en Optica  is founded. 
 The Ollin Yoliztli Prize is awarded for the first time. 
 The Palacio de Lecumberri starts housing the General National Archive
 July 31–August 11: Hurricane Allen. 
 October 24: 1980 Oaxaca earthquake.

Awards
Belisario Domínguez Medal of Honor – Luis Padilla Nervo

Film

 List of Mexican films of 1980.

Sport

 1979–80 Mexican Primera División season.
 Saraperos de Saltillo win the Mexican League.
 Mexico at the 1980 Summer Olympics.
 Mexico at the 1980 Summer Paralympics. 
 Correcaminos UAT founded.

Births
 February 4 – Gerardo Alcántara, soccer player
 March 18 — Olga Vargas, synchronized swimmer
March 30 — Mauricio Vila Dosal, Governor of Yucatán 2018–2024
November 15 — Diego Sinhué Rodríguez Vallejo, Governor of Guanajuato starting 2018
December 12 — Pablo Baltodano Monroy, diplomat and politician

Deaths
 March 18 — Erich Fromm, German-American psychologist and philosopher who lived in Cuernavaca from 1956-1976 (b. 1900)
May 13 — Carmen García González, wife of President Emilio Portes Gil (1928-1930) (b. 1905)

References

 
Mexico